The Turks in the Arab world refers to ethnic Turkish people who live in the Arab World. There are significant Turkish populations scattered throughout North Africa, the Levant, and the Arabian Peninsula.

In Libya, some groups identify themselves as Turkish, or descendants of Turkish soldiers who settled in the area in the days of the Ottoman Empire There is also a significant Turkish minority in Egypt (see Turks in Egypt).

In the Levant, the Turks live across the region. In Iraq and Syria the Turkish minorities are commonly been referred to as "Turkmen", "Turkman" and "Turcoman"; historically, these terms have been used to designate Turkish speakers in Arab areas, or Sunni Muslims in Shitte areas. The majority of Iraqi Turkmen and Syrian Turkmen are the descendants of Ottoman Turkish settlers. and share close cultural and linguistic ties with Turkey, particularly the Anatolian region. There are also Turkish minorities located in Jordan (Turks in Jordan) and Lebanon (Turks in Lebanon). The Lebanese Turks live mainly in the villages of Aydamun and Kouachra in the Akkar District, as well as in Baalbek, Beirut, and Tripoli.

In the Arabian Peninsula, there are Turkish minorities who have lived in the region since the Ottoman era. The Turks live predominately in Saudi Arabia (see Turks in Saudi Arabia) and Yemen (see Turks in Yemen).

Population of Turkish minorities

See also 
Turks in Europe
Turkish population

Notes

References

Bibliography 
 
 
 
 
 

 .
.
.
.

.

External links 
Republic of Turkey: Ministry of Foreign Affairs
Republic of Turkey: Ministry of Labour and Social Security
Dış İlişkiler ve Yurtdışı İşçi Hizmetleri Genel Müdürlüğü

Turkish communities outside Turkey
Turkish diaspora
Turkology
Ethnic groups in the Arab world